Thiruvananthapuram–Angamaly Greenfield Highway is a  planned greenfield access-controlled highway in Kerala, India. The proposed greenfield highway running parallel to the Main Central Road is to ensure better connectivity between Thiruvananthapuram and Angamaly through several regions of Kottayam and Kottarakkara.

Route description
It would run parallel to the Main Central Road and begins from Pulimath in Thiruvananthapuram. It would go through Pulimath, Kallara, Kadakkal, Anchal , Pathanapuram, Konni, Kumplampoika, Kanjirapalli, Thitanad, Pravithanam, Thodupuzha and Malayattoor, finally ending at Angamaly.

History
Considering the development of pilgrimage and tourism sectors, it was decided to develop a new national highway, parallel to the Main Central Road (MC Road). The original plan was to expand the existing two lane MC Road into a four lane. However a situation arised where many towns have to be demolished for the development of  MC Road. This also required to pay huge compensation for the buildings and land acquired from the people. Hence the government changes the plan and decided to construct a new 6 lane highway parallel to the MC Road. Earlier it was decided to start the highway from Aruvikkkara. Later, the National Highways Authority decided to change the plan. The highway would connect with the proposed Vizhinjam–Navaikulam outer ring road.

References

Proposed roads in India
Proposed infrastructure in Kerala
Transport in Thiruvananthapuram